XHCUT-FM is a radio station on 101.7 FM in Cuautla, Morelos, primarily serving Cuernavaca. It is owned by Grupo Diario de Morelos and carries a grupera format known as La Comadre.

History
XHCUT received its concession on December 9, 1993. It was initially owned by Federico Bracamontes Galvez, founder of the Diario de Morelos newspaper. The two media remain co-owned.

Despite using the La Comadre name, this station is not owned by Grupo ACIR, which owns most of the stations using that name in Mexico.

References

External links
La Comadre 101.7 Facebook

Regional Mexican radio stations
Radio stations in Morelos